Hui County or Huixian is a county under the administration of Longnan City, in the southeast of Gansu Province, China, bordering Shaanxi province to the south. The postal code is 742300.

Administrative divisions

Hui County is divided into 13 towns and 2 townships:
Towns

-Towns are upgraded from Township.

Townships
Yushu Township
Yuguan Township

Climate

References

 
County-level divisions of Gansu
Longnan